SM Abu Sayeed (1 January 1937 – 28 August 2017) is a Jatiya Party (Ershad) politician and the former member of parliament for Narail-1. He was the organizer of the Liberation War of Bangladesh.

Early life 
SM Abu Sayeed was born on 1 January 1937 in Narail District.

Career
Sayeed was the principal of Khulna Daulatpur Diba Nishi College and Shaheed Abdus Salam Degree College. He left the Awami League in 1984 and joined the Jatiya Party. He was the chairman of Kalia Upazila Parishad. He was the chairman of Narail district council. He was elected to parliament from Narail-1 as a Jatiya Party candidate in 1986 and 1988. In 1996, he rejoined the Awami League and was elected president of the Narail District Krishak League.

Death 
SM Abu Sayeed died on 28 August 2017.

References

1937 births
2017 deaths
People from Narail District
Bangladeshi academics
Jatiya Party politicians
3rd Jatiya Sangsad members
4th Jatiya Sangsad members
Awami League politicians